38 Canadian Brigade Group (38 CBG) is a formation of the Canadian Forces and Canadian Army's 3rd Canadian Division. The brigade group is composed of Primary Reserve units in Manitoba, Saskatchewan and Northwestern Ontario east to Thunder Bay. Geographically, 38 CBG is Canada's largest brigade group. The brigade headquarters is located in Winnipeg, Manitoba.

The brigade's units are spread out over many communities, and most of the soldiers serving in the brigade's units are reservists, part-time soldiers who serve within units in those communities. The brigade group is prepared to deploy and augment the Regular Force of the 3rd Canadian Division in domestic operations (natural disasters, etc.) as well as support battle groups.

The brigade has served in several domestic operations, including Operation Assistance (the assistance to the Manitoba's 1997 flood), and Operation Peregrine (assistance to the 2003 BC forest fire emergency). Many soldiers of the brigade deployed to Afghanistan, as well as on UN and NATO missions.

The commanding officer of the 38 CBG is Colonel Shawn Fortin, CD. The 38 CBG Brigade Sergeant-Major (BSM) is Chief Warrant Officer Todd Appel, CD.

Brigade units

Also under command of the brigade group headquarters is the 38 Canadian Brigade Group Arctic Response Company Group (ARCG).

External links

References

Brigades of the Canadian Army
Military units and formations established in 1997